Marcus Quinctilius Varus was a consular tribune of the Roman Republic in 403 BC.

Quinctilius belonged to the Quinctilia gens, an obscure gens of the Republic which had produced one consular previously, Sextus Quinctilius Varus, consul in 453 BC. Quinctilius relationship to this previous consular is unknown and later Quinctilia first appear in our sources again in 203 BC during the end of the Second Punic War.

Career 
Quinctilius held the imperium in 403 BC as one of six consular tribunes. He shared the office with Manius Aemilius Mamercinus. Appius Claudius Crassus Inregillensis, Lucius Valerius Potitus. Lucius Julius Iulus and Marcus Furius Fusus. The college, with the exception of Aemilius and Valerius, were all first time consulars. Livy, when writing of this college, incorrectly includes the two censors Marus Furius Camillus and Marus Postumius Albinus Regillensis into the consular college. The year saw the continuation of the war started in 406 against the Veii with all consulars (including Quinctilius) leading armies against the Veii, with the exception of Claudius who remained in Rome. The long years of war and new payments towards the soldiers seems to have strained the economy of Rome and the two censors, Camillus and Postumius imposed new taxes targeting bachelors and orphans.

See also

References 

5th-century BC Romans
Roman Republic
Roman consular tribunes
Quinctilii
403 BC